Antennaria soliceps is a rare species of flowering plant in the family Asteraceae known by the common name Charleston Mountain pussytoes. It has been found only on Mount Charleston in Clark County in the southern part of the US state of Nevada.

Antennaria soliceps is a small plant rarely growing more than 2 inches (5 cm) from the ground, spreading by means of horizontal stems running along the surface of the ground. All known plants discovered to date are female, the species apparently relying exclusively on asexual reproduction. It grows on talus slopes near the tree line in the mountains, 3000–3400 meters (10,000–11,300 feet) above sea level.

References

External links

Burke Museum, Burke Museum of Natural History and Culture, University of Washington (Seattle), herbarium database photos and collection data of isotypes of Antennaria soliceps

soliceps
Flora of Nevada
Plants described in 1938